The Men’s Singles tournament of the 2007 Stuttgart Open tennis championship (also known as the Mercedes Cup) took place in Stuttgart, Germany, between 16 and 22 July 2007. 32 players from 12 countries competed in the 5-round tournament. The final winner was Rafael Nadal of Spain, who defeated Stanislas Wawrinka of Switzerland. The defending champion from 2006, David Ferrer, was eliminated in the second round.

Seeds

Draws

Key
Q - Qualifier
WC - Wild Card
r - Retired

Finals

Section 1

Section 2

References

External links
 Singles draw
 Qualifying draw

Stuttgart Open Singles
Singles 2007